The 2014 Incarnate Word Cardinals football team represented the University of the Incarnate Word in the 2014 NCAA Division I FCS football season. The Cardinals played their first season in the Southland Conference. They were led by third-year head coach Larry Kennan. Home games were played at Gayle and Tom Benson Stadium. They finished the season 2–9, 2–6 in Southland play to finish in ninth place.

TV and radio
All Incarnate Word games will be broadcast on CBS Sports Radio 860 AM with the voices of Gabe Farias and Shawn Morris. CBS Sports Radio 860 AM broadcasts will be available at their CBS Sports Radio 860 AM. KUIW Radio will also produce a student media broadcast every week, that will be available online, and they will provide streaming of all non-televised home games via UIWtv.

Schedule

Despite both being members of the Southland Conference, the game vs. Stephen F. Austin is considered a non-conference matchup and was scheduled between the two schools, not by the Conference.

Personnel

Coaching staff

Roster

Game summaries

Sacramento State

Sources:

Stephen F. Austin

Sources:

North Dakota State

Sources:

Abilene Christian

Sources:

Southeastern Louisiana

Sources:

Houston Baptist

Sources:

Northwestern State

Sources:

McNeese State

Sources:

Nicholls State

Sources:

Sam Houston State

Sources:

Lamar

Sources:

References

Incarnate Word
Incarnate Word Cardinals football seasons
Incarnate Word Cardinals football